Summerland Secondary School (or SSS) is a public secondary school in Summerland, British Columbia, Canada.   It is operated by School District 67 Okanagan Skaha.  It is the only secondary school in Summerland and one of three in the school district.  The school is fed from Summerland Middle School and two elementary schools.   The school also hosts a French Immersion program for all grades.

Academic & special programs
In addition to a full range of standard academic courses, the school also offers:
 FDTV
 Computer Animation. 
 Alternate program
 French Immersion Program (one class for each grade) 
 Adult Learning Centre 
 Hockey Skills Academy 
 Bridge Program

Career and vocation education
"C.A.V.E." programs include: 
 Career Preparation
 Work Experience
 Secondary School Apprenticeship
 Career Transition Program (CTP), a dual-credit program with one-year Entry Level Training in trades at Okanagan College's campus in Kelowna. 
 Accelerated Credit Enrollment in Industry Training (ACE IT), offering programs in partnership with Okanagan College in the fields of Horticulture, Joinery, Residential Construction, and Culinary Arts.

History and facilities
SSS was formerly known as Summerland High School.  A high school was founded in Summerland as early as 1909.  Renovations to the entry and office area were undertaken in 2008.

References

External links
School District school webpage
Fraser Institute School Report Card

High schools in British Columbia
Schools in the Okanagan
Educational institutions in Canada with year of establishment missing